Falmouth is a town in Barnstable County, Massachusetts, United States. The population was 32,517 at the 2020 census, making Falmouth the second-largest municipality on Cape Cod after Barnstable. The terminal for the Steamship Authority ferries to Martha's Vineyard is located in the village of Woods Hole in Falmouth. Woods Hole also contains several scientific organizations such as the Woods Hole Oceanographic Institution (WHOI), the Marine Biological Laboratory (MBL), the Woodwell Climate Research Center, NOAA's Woods Hole Science Aquarium, and the scientific institutions' various museums.

For geographic and demographic information on specific parts of the town of Falmouth, please see the articles on East Falmouth, Falmouth Village, North Falmouth, Teaticket, West Falmouth, and Woods Hole. Falmouth also encompasses the villages of Hatchville and Waquoit, which are not census-designated places and fall within the village of East Falmouth based on postal service.

History

Falmouth was first settled by English colonists in 1660 and was officially incorporated in 1686. Bartholomew Gosnold named the settlement for Falmouth, Cornwall, England, his home port. Early principal activities were farming, salt works, shipping, whaling, and sheep husbandry, which was very popular due to the introduction of Merino sheep and the beginnings of water-powered mills that could process the wool. In 1837, Falmouth averaged about 50 sheep per square mile.

Falmouth saw brief action in the War of 1812, when the area around Falmouth Heights, on its southern coast, was bombarded by several British frigates and ships of the line, and Massachusetts militia hastily entrenched themselves on the beaches to repulse a possible British landing which never came. By 1872, the train had come to Falmouth and Woods Hole, and some of the first summer homes were established. By the late 19th century, cranberries were being cultivated and strawberries were being raised for the Boston market. Large-scale dairying was tried in the early 20th century in interior regions. After the improvement in highways, and thanks in part to the heavy use of neighboring Camp Edwards (now part of Joint Base Cape Cod) during World War II, population growth increased significantly. Large homebuilding booms occurred in the 1970s, followed by others in the 1980s and 1990s.

In 1965, Robert Manry sailed from Falmouth aboard his  sailboat and reached Falmouth, Great Britain, 78 days later.

Historic districts

The town of Falmouth has seven historic districts, including four on the National Register of Historic Places:
Falmouth Village Green
North Falmouth Village
Waquoit
West Falmouth Village
The other three historic districts are in Woods Hole, Davisville, and Quissett.

In addition to the historic districts, Falmouth has ten individual sites on the National Register:
Central Fire Station 
Crowell-Bourne Farm
Elnathan Nye House
Falmouth Pumping Station
Josiah Tobey House
Lawrence Academy
Nobska Light
Poor House and Methodist Cemetery
Teaticket School
Woods Hole School

Offshore Falmouth in Buzzards Bay, Cleveland East Ledge Light is listed with the National Register.

Geography 

Most of Falmouth, like the rest of Cape Cod, sits on glacial sands composed of glacial outwash deposits. However, the soil in the southwestern part of the town, consisting of moraine deposits, is more rocky and dense, like the rest of New England, and many glacial erratics are scattered about, having been dropped by the retreating glaciers. The climate is temperate marine. There is no exposed bedrock. Rainfall is evenly distributed throughout the year and averages 2 to 3 in (50–75 mm) per month.

Falmouth lies on the southwestern tip of Cape Cod. It is bordered by Bourne and Sandwich to the north, Mashpee to the east, Vineyard Sound to the south, and Buzzards Bay to the west.

Falmouth's topography is similar to the rest of Cape Cod's, with many small ponds, creeks, and inlets surrounded by the pines and oaks of the Cape and often rocky beachfront. Falmouth's southern shore is notable for a series of ponds and rivers spaced very closely together, all of which travel some distance into the town. These include, from west to east, Falmouth Inner Harbor, Little Pond, Great Pond (which leads to the Dexter and Coonamesset rivers), Green Pond, Bourne's Pond, Eel Pond (which leads to the Childs River), and Waquoit Bay, which lies along the Mashpee town line. The Buzzards Bay side of the town is primarily bays divided by necks, peninsulas connected to land by isthmi. The largest inlet is Megansett Cove along the Bourne town line. The Buzzards Bay shore of Falmouth is punctuated by a number of hamlets, including, from north to south, Megansett, New Silver Beach, Old Silver, Chappaquoit, Sippewisset, Quissett, and Woods Hole.

Climate

According to the Köppen climate classification system, Falmouth, Massachusetts has a warm-summer, wet all year, humid continental climate (Dfb). Dfb climates are characterized by at least one month having an average mean temperature ≤ 32.0 °F (≤ 0.0 °C), at least four months with an average mean temperature ≥ 50.0 °F (≥ 10.0 °C), all months with an average mean temperature ≤ 71.6 °F (≤ 22.0 °C), and no significant precipitation difference between seasons. The average seasonal (Nov–Apr) snowfall total is around 30 in (76 cm). The average snowiest month is February which corresponds with the annual peak in nor'easter activity. According to the United States Department of Agriculture, the plant hardiness zone is 7a with an average annual extreme minimum air temperature of 1.3 °F (–17.1 °C).

Ecology

According to the A. W. Kuchler U.S. Potential natural vegetation Types, Falmouoth, Massachusetts would primarily contain a Northeastern Oak/Pine (110) vegetation type with a Southern Mixed Forest (26) vegetation form.

Transportation

Falmouth's main road is Massachusetts Route 28, which runs south from Bourne as a divided highway, then becomes a surface road and heads east through downtown as Main Street, then turns northeast through East Falmouth before crossing into Mashpee. As one of two major east–west routes on the Cape, Route 28 is regularly congested, and there is minimal room for widening opportunities. Route 151 runs east–west through the northern section of the town, connecting North Falmouth and Hatchville with Mashpee.

Falmouth is home to The Woods Hole, Martha's Vineyard and Nantucket Steamship Authority. Daily ferry service brings tourists, residents and supplies from Woods Hole to Nantucket and Martha's Vineyard. It is the main ferry line between the Vineyard and the mainland (as Nantucket is further east, its main line leaves Hyannis). A seasonal ferry, the Island Queen, runs from Falmouth Harbor to Martha's Vineyard.

The Massachusetts Coastal Railroad provides rail freight service to North Falmouth, where a spur runs into Otis Air Base to serve a trash transfer station. Also, as of a June 25, 2009 capecodonline.com article, the company plans to re-extend passenger railroad service to the town, complete with dinner and tourist trains, though this will also be only to North Falmouth, due to the fact that the other  of railroad track had been replaced with the current Shining Sea Bikeway. On November 21, 2009, North Falmouth saw its first passenger train in at least 12 years. The nearest inter-city (Amtrak) passenger rail stations are Providence and Boston's South Station. The Middleborough/Lakeville and Kingston/Route 3 stations of the MBTA's commuter rail system provide the closest service to Boston.

There is a private air park in East Falmouth, and the nearest national and international air service is at Logan International Airport in Boston and T. F. Green Airport near Providence, both being about equidistant from Falmouth. There is a regional airport in nearby Hyannis.

Falmouth is also served by the Cape Cod Regional Transit Authority bus routes.

Demographics

As of the census of 2000, there were 32,660 people, 13,859 households, and 8,980 families residing in the town. The racial makeup of the town was 93.39% White, 1.82% Black or African American, 0.51% Native American, 0.92% Asian, 0.02% Pacific Islander, 1.44% from other races, and 1.91% from two or more races. Hispanic or Latino of any race were 1.28% of the population.

There were 13,859 households, out of which 24.2% had children under the age of 18 living with them, 52.0% were married couples living together, 10.1% had a female householder with no husband present, and 35.2% were non-families. 29.8% of all households were made up of individuals, and 14.0% had someone living alone who was 65 years of age or older. The average household size was 2.30 and the average family size was 2.84.

In the town, the population was spread out, with 20.7% under the age of 18, 4.8% from 18 to 24, 24.5% from 25 to 44, 27.5% from 45 to 64, and 22.5% who were 65 years of age or older. The median age was 45 years. For every 100 females, there were 87.6 males. For every 100 females age 18 and over, there were 83.9 males.

The median income for a household in the town was $68,191, and the median income for a family was $97,422. Males had a median income of $61,797 versus $38,867 for females. The per capita income for the town was $42,548. About 4.5% of families and 6.9% of the population were below the poverty line, including 8.8% of those under age 18 and 6.2% of those age 65 or over.

Government and Politics
Falmouth is represented in the Massachusetts House of Representatives as a part of two districts, the Third Barnstable (which also includes portions of Barnstable, Bourne and Mashpee), and the Barnstable, Dukes and Nantucket District, which includes all of Martha's Vineyard, Nantucket and Gosnold. The town is represented in the Massachusetts Senate as a part of the Plymouth and Barnstable district, which includes Bourne, Kingston, Pembroke, Plymouth, and Sandwich. The town is patrolled by the Seventh (Bourne) Barracks of Troop D of the Massachusetts State Police.

On the national level, Falmouth is a part of Massachusetts's 9th congressional district, and is currently represented by Bill Keating.

Falmouth is governed by the representative town meeting form of government with 9 precincts of 27 members each serving three-year terms and is led by a five-member board of selectmen serving rotating three-year terms. The town operates its own police and fire departments, with a central police station and five fire stations. The fire department also operates the town's ambulance service with four-ambulances staffed 24/7. The town's central library is located downtown. There are branches in North and East Falmouth, and private libraries in West Falmouth and Woods Hole which are open to the public. There are seven post offices in town for the six ZIP codes, although several overlap and the main office handles the majority of the work. Falmouth is also the site of Falmouth Hospital, which serves the Upper Cape region.

Education

Falmouth's public school system serves about 4,500 students yearly. There are four schools, East Falmouth, Mullen-Hall, North Falmouth, and Teaticket, which serve the elementary school population, from pre-kindergarten to fourth grade. The Morse Pond Middle School serves grades five and six, while the Lawrence Junior High School serves grades seven and eight. Falmouth High School covers grades 9–12. (Prior to 1974 the 9–12 grades were in the Lawrence building and known as Lawrence High School.) FHS's athletics teams are nicknamed the Clippers, and their colors are maroon and white. They compete in the Atlantic Coast League, having moved recently from the Old Colony League. Their chief rival is nearby Barnstable High School. The public schools are supported in part by the Volunteers in Public Schools (VIPS), various PTO associations, the Falmouth Scholarship Association, the Falmouth Education Foundation (FEF), the Falmouth STEM Boosters and the Woods Hole Science Technology Partnership.

Falmouth is also the home of a private school, Falmouth Academy, serving grades 7 through 12. Falmouth high school students may also choose to attend the Upper Cape Cod Regional Technical High School in Bourne free of charge. Resident students can also attend Sturgis Charter Public School in Hyannis also free of charge, pending acceptance through a lottery.

Sports and recreation

Falmouth is home to the Falmouth Commodores, an amateur collegiate summer baseball team in the Cape Cod Baseball League. The team plays at Arnie Allen Diamond at Guv Fuller Field, and has featured dozens of players who went on to careers in Major League Baseball, such as Tino Martinez, Darin Erstad, and Jacoby Ellsbury.

Falmouth is the home of its namesake Falmouth Road Race, an annual race started in 1973 that draws over 10,000 runners from all over the world. The race runs  from the village of Woods Hole to Falmouth Heights Beach in downtown Falmouth.

Arts and entertainment 
Falmouth is home to a vibrant theatre community. The College Light Opera Company has performed at the Highfield Theatre every summer since 1969.  Other institutions include the Falmouth Theatre Guild and the Cape Cod Theatre Project.

In addition to theatre, there is the Cape Cod Conservatory and the Falmouth Arts Guild.

Notable people

 Peter Abrahams, author
 Ben Affleck, actor
 Casey Affleck, actor
 Katharine Lee Bates, writer of "America the Beautiful"
 Steve Cishek, relief pitcher for the Chicago Cubs
 Colleen Coyne, 1998 Olympic gold medalist on the U.S. women's ice hockey team
 Wesley Dennis (illustrator), illustrator of children's books
 Pete Doherty (wrestler) "The Duke of Dorchester"
 Jessica Dubroff, 7-year-old pilot trainee who died in a plane crash
 Jacob Sloat Fassett, U.S. congressman from Elmira, New York; Fassett's Point in West Falmouth and the town of Fassett, Quebec, are named after him
 Melissa Febos, writer
 Paul Harney, former professional PGA golfer, resided in Falmouth and owned the Paul Harney Golf Club in Hatchville
 Edward Hopkins Jenkins (1850–1931), agricultural chemist; director of the Connecticut Agricultural Experiment Station (1900–1923); born in Falmouth
 Frederick E. Olmsted, WPA muralist and sculptor then later scientist
 Julia O'Malley-Keyes, fine artist
 Joseph Rago, journalist
 Charles Bennett Ray Abolitionist journalist 
 Greg Dean Schmitz, online film journalist (Yahoo! Movies, Rotten Tomatoes) 
 Sunita Williams, astronaut and United States Navy officer

Military installations 
Camp Edwards, formerly named Camp Falmouth, is a US military training camp in western Barnstable County. It is the largest part of Joint Base Cape Cod, formerly named Massachusetts Military Reservation.
The installation is of economic and environmental importance.

Groundwater pollution 

During the 1970s and 1980s, it was discovered that the groundwater in some areas of Falmouth had been contaminated by toxic chemicals linked to the disposal of jet fuel, solvents, industrial chemicals, and other substances on the Massachusetts Military Reservation, now known as Joint Base Cape Cod. Plumes of groundwater pollution that reached into Falmouth contaminated household well water in some neighborhoods and forced the town to shut down a public  well in 1975 that accounted for 25% of the town's public water supply. A major report was released on the contamination in 1986. In 1996, the Air Force Center for Environmental Excellence (now known as the Air Force Center for Engineering and the Environment) assumed responsibility for the cleanup, treating soils at several sites and installing pumping wells in an effort to contain the plumes of groundwater contamination.

In 2010, the Silent Spring Institute tested about 20 public water supplies, 40 percent of which had detectable levels of perfluorinated compounds (PFCs). In 2015, the Air Force started testing private wells in the Currier Road area after water treatment plant samples showed elevated levels of 1,4-dioxane. Since May 2016, four houses in the Currier Road neighborhood have been receiving bottled water for elevated levels of PFCs after the U.S. Environmental Protection Agency established a national standard for PFCs, such as PFOS and PFOAs.

References

External links 

 Town of Falmouth Official Website
 Falmouth Historical Society
 Falmouth Chamber of Commerce Tourist Information

 
1660 establishments in Massachusetts
Populated coastal places in Massachusetts
Populated places established in 1660
Towns in Barnstable County, Massachusetts
Towns in Massachusetts